Garia  (Bengali:গড়িয়া) is a neighborhood in south Kolkata, West Bengal, India. It is bordered by the neighborhoods of Jadavpur in the north, Bansdroni/Tollygunge in the north-west, Santoshpur/Mukundapur in the north-east and Narendrapur/Rajpur Sonarpur in the south. It is on the banks of Adi Ganga.

The southern part of the Eastern Metropolitan Bypass runs through the heart of the neighborhood. The area contains a prominent traffic junction from which a variety of public transport is available, making it a prime travel connection spot in South Kolkata.

Etymology
Garia may have received its name from kandelia candel, a native mangrove tree species, which was called Guriya (Bengali: গুড়িয়া) in the Sundarbani dialect of Bengali. It is said that in ancient times the Sundarbans forest covered the area of present-day Garia and extended north all the way to Sealdah and that locals subsequently gave this area the name of Garia. However, Garia may have also gotten its name from the Muslim community originally from Gauda, Gauriyā, who lived nearby. It is said that this group is currently living in the northern part of Patuli; however, many scholars do not accept this theory.

Alternatively, the name Garia may have come from the large Gaudiya Vaishnav community living in the neighborhood. In the 15th century, the famous social reformer of Bengal, Sri Chaitanya Mahaprabhu, traveled through Adi Ganga on his Nilachal Yatra and stopped near present-day Garia; Vaishnavas (Baishnabs) have lived in the area since, and perhaps took inspiration for the name from that of the saint. Baishnabghata and Kamdahari, nearby townships, are hypothesized to have the same source of etymological history.

History
Garia is one of the oldest settlements in the region. Adi Ganga (also known as Tolly's Nala), which connects Kolkata to the Bidyadhari River to the east, runs through the middle of the neighborhood. It was a generally peaceful residential neighborhood before the partition of India, which changed the social composition of the area.

Through the course of the partition process, refugees came and settled in the farmlands and country houses of the rich landowners of Kolkata in Garia, increasing the population of the area by several thousands.

Garia became a refugee settlement, along with Jadavpur and Tollygunge, in the southern fringes of the city. Slowly after the initial upheaval, development of the area resumed and it gradually became peaceful once again.

With the expansion of Kolkata to the east and the south during the 1990s, the area witnessed further change. Garia was the southern end of the Eastern Metropolitan Bypass. This road connected Garia to the north of the city and newly developing areas like Salt Lake and New Town, and also to the Dum Dum Airport and spurred the rapid commercialization of the area. Already home to two major bus terminals, Garia became the transport and commercial hub of the region.

Present day
Kanungo Park, established by Sri Manindra Lal Das (of The Directorate of Settlement Department of West Bengal), was the first planned settlement in Garia and was inspired by Milian Park in Washington D.C. It, along with most other new planned settlements, was located to the north of the junction of N.S.C. Bose Road and Raja Subodh Chandra Mullick Road (known today as Garia More Road).

The locality is now home to some of the most upmarket apartment complexes in the city and caters to people looking to get away from the congestion of Kolkata. Notable complexes include Hiland Park, Avani's Victoria Greens, Westwind, Orbit City, Sunny Seasons, Victoria Greens, Sugam Park, Sherwood Estate, and Bengal Ambuja's Upohar.

More apartment complexes, such as Sugam Sudhir, PS Srijan Ozone, and Modello Highs are also nearing completion. Garia's population also continues to increase. Additionally, more residential flats are being built, leading roads to be increasingly congested and bringing Garia in line with most other places in Kolkata.

One of Kolkata's red-light districts is situated in Garia.

Settlements within Garia
Garia covers the residential areas of Kanungo Park, New Garia, Chak Garia, Garia Park, Baghajatin, Ajoy Nagar, Baishnabghata-Patuli, Techno City, Panchpota, Model Town, Ganguly Bagan, Tentulberia, East Tentulberia, Ramgarh, Briji, Dhalai Bridge, Kamalgazi, Mahamayatala, Nabagram, Pearabagan, Boral, Sreenagar, Nayabad, Panchasayar, Kandarpopur Town, Fartabad, Garia railway station, Balia, Sreerampur, and certain parts of New Ajoynagar.

New Garia

New Garia is a fast-growing neighborhood in the eastern part of Garia. The southern terminal metro station of Kolkata Metro is located here.

Chak Garia

Chak Garia, also known as Chakgaria, is an upmarket neighborhood in the eastern part of Garia. It contains several high rises such as Hiland Park and Bengal Ambuja Upohar.

Baishnabghata Patuli Township

Baishnabghata-Patuli Township is a township located on the EM Bypass. The township is a project funded by the World Bank.

Mahamayatala
Mahamayatala is a well-known residential area in Garia. There are several modern luxurious residential complexes, medical centers, banks, department stores, fusion-cuisine restaurants and bars. The well-known Maa Mahamaya Temple is found here.

Pearabagan
Pearabagan is a major locality in South Garia. It is a residential area with a bazaar popularly known as "Kalibazar". There are many schools in the area including the co-ed Laskarpur Vidyapith school. BDMI school in Pearabagan is connected with Purba Para, Laskarpur. The post office of Laskarpur is situated here. The Rishi Apartment, Elina Apartment, and Narayani Apartment complexes are also located here.

Tetultala
Tetultala is a residential area located between Mahamayatala and Hindustan More. Various residential buildings and housing complexes are situated in this locality, such as Sanghati Abasan, Victoria Enclave, Tinni Apartment, Puskar Abasan, Basundhara Apartment, and Luv Kush Apartment.

Hindustan More
Hindustan More is another posh  upmarket area, with renowned multi-specialty nursing homes such as Hindustan Health Point and several markets, as well as a BSF camp, the West Bengal State Electricity Board office, fire brigade department, HDFC Bank, and complex like ganguly group 4sight florence.

Kandarpopur Town
Kandarpopur Town is a major locality of Garia situated beside the Eastern Metropolitan Bypass. Garia Railway Station and Shahid Khudiram Metro Station serve the area. It is one of Garia's fastest-growing neighborhoods.

Geographic location
The junction of Raja S.C.Mullick Road, N.S.C. Bose Road and Garia Main Road adjacent to Kanungo Park is known as "Garia More".

Transport

Garia features two state bus terminals (No.5, No.6, S-7 and S-21).
There are three private bus terminals as well. One is used by 80A(running between Garia and Alipore Zoo) and 80B (running between Garia and Esplanade), another is used by a minibus service running between Garia and B.B.D.Bag.(Route 105) There is another bus terminal used by a bus running between Garia and Barasat.There are several bus routes connecting Garia to the rest of the city.

The Kavi Nazrul Metro Station connects Garia to the Kolkata Metro network. Two more stations - Shahid Khudiram (near EM Bypass and Garia Station Road) and Kavi Subhash (adjacent to the New Garia Railway Station) - have been operational since 7 October 2010.

Garia Railway Station connects Garia to the Indian Railways network.

List of Metro Stations
 Kavi Subhash (formerly New Garia)
 Shahid Khudiram (formerly Birji)
 Kavi Nazrul (formerly Garia Bazar)
 Satyajit Ray (under construction)
 Gitanjali (previously Naktala)

List of Railway Stations
 Garia
 New Garia
 Baghajatin

List of major roads
 Eastern Metropolitan Bypass
 Netaji Subash Chandra Bose Road
 Raja SC Mullick Road
 Garia Main Road
 Garia Station Road
 Boral Main Road

Shopping
Garia is one of the major shopping areas of Kolkata. Notable shopping malls and department stores include: 
 Metropolis Mall, Hiland Park, EM Bypass, Chak Garia
 Big Bazaar, Orbit Mall, Garia
 Spencer's, Garia Station Road
 Spencer's Express, Baishnabghata Patuli Township
 Spencer's Express, Tolly Heights, Naktala
 Proyozonio
 Bizarre Bazar
 Sonar Bangla Shopping Complex
 Pooja Plaza (Near Garia Bazaar)
 Parnashree Market (Near Garia Main Road)
 New Raghunath Market
 Brand Factory (Near Mahamayatala, Garia)

Medical facilities
Several medical institutes are found within Garia.
 The Apollo Clinic
 Bengal Rural Welfare Service (BRWS) Hospital
 Banchbo Healing Touch
 Peerless Hospital (Panchasayar)
 Remedy Hospital (Kalitala)
 Lifeline Hospital (Pratapgarh)
 Namita Biswas Memorial Eye Hospital (Garia Station)
 Sevangan Nursing Home
 Smilz Dental Treatment Facility (Garia Park)
 Remedy Diagnostic Center
 Medich Health Clinic and Diagnostic Centre
 Friends Diagnostic Private Limited
 Mother Teresa Memorial TB Hospital and Research Centre
Neotia Mediplus Super Specialty Clinic (part of Park Hospitals), 168 Garia Main Road, Kolkata 700084 (Opp. 228 bus stand)

Education

Garia is home to several academic, research and professional institutions. Major colleges, schools and research institutions located here include:
 Netaji Subhash Engineering College
 Indian Centre for Space Physics, Garia Station Road
 Dinabandhu Andrews College-affiliated to Calcutta University.
 Satyajit Ray Film and Television Institute
 Centre for Studies in Social Sciences, Calcutta
 Seacom Marine College
 National Institute of Hotel Management, Kolkata
 Sammilani Mahavidyalaya
 K.K. Das College
 Future Institute of Engineering and Management
 Swami Vivekananda Institute of Science and Technology
 Neotia Academy Of Nursing, Chak Garia
 Indus Valley World School
 Welland Gouldsmith School
 Techno India Group Public School
 Techno Model School
 Miranda High School
 B.D. Memorial Institute-Mahamayatala
 Garia Baroda Prasad High School
 Garia Harimati Devi U. Balika School
 Garia Vidyabhavana South School
 Kids World School
 Ideal commercial College
 Garia Madrasah Badrul Uloom Quraniya - Islamic Educational Institute
 Balia Nafar Chandra Balika Vidyalaya
 Tentulberia Anukul Chandra High School

Notable non-governmental organizations
 BANCHBO - Education of children, elderly care, and female empowerment
 Boral Kalpataru Seva Samity - Provides free health checks and medicines (Govt. registration num. S/2L/38619)
 Grace and Glory of God (Kamalgazi)- Provides for the needy and helps to educate children

Places of interest
 Hiland Park, the second tallest tower in Kolkata (after South City) (located in Chak Garia on the E. M. Bypass)
 The Conclave Club Verde Vista, Chak Garia
 Garia Bazaar is one of the largest wholesale fish and vegetable markets in Kolkata
 Sant Sri Asaramji Ashram, near Netaji Subhash Engineering College
 Bharat Sevashram Sangha, located near Briji
 Very old twin temples at Garia Burning Ghat
 Garia Buddha Temple
 Baroda Avenue Kali Temple (one of the oldest Kali temples of Garia)
 Tripurasundari Temple (one of the oldest temples in Bengal)
 Kaliganga canal
 Shri Shri Baba Lokenath Brahmachari Mandir
 Bipattarini Mandir (smaller version of the original Bipattarini Temple in Rajpur)
 Mahamaya Mandir 
 Jora Mandir near Kali Ganga 
 Baishnab Ghata Putul Park
 Shree Guru Asram, Naktala
 Sheetala Mata Mandir, Near Boral Chowk (near Narayan Mistanna Bhandar)
 Floating Market, Patuli
 Many residential complexes (4 Sight Sapphire, 4 Sight Model Town, 4 Sight Florence, 4 Sight Mushroom etc.)

Festivals

 Durga Puja is celebrated in Garia.
 Buddha Jayanti is a celebration of 3 important events in Lord Buddha's life (Birth, Buddhata, Maha Parinirvan) at Garia Buddha Temple on Buddha Purnima Day.
 Kathina Chivara Dana is a special occasion for Buddhists, especially for Buddhist monks and is celebrated after their completion of 3 months of Varsha Mash at Garia Buddha Temple.
 Baishnabghata Patuli Boi Mela is a book fair at Kendua Shanti Sangha first held in December 2012.
 Seva Utsav, organized by Dakshin Kalikata Krira O Sanskriti Parishad, has been a successful community program for 35 years. Activities include a free eye operation camp and medical camp, various cultural competitions and programmes, a torch relay, exhibitions, workshops, demonstrations, the All Bengal Yogasan Competition, Baul Mela, Kavi Sammelan, seminars, etc.
 Rakhi Utsav is the annual function of the Sreerampur Kalyan Samity.
 West Bengal Art and Handicrafts Fair (sponsored by the Govt. of West Bengal)
 Old Rath Yatra fair at Rathtala 
 Puja Rating and Rides (organised by Banchbo)
 International Senior Citizen Day is celebrated on 1 October of every year. The event is organized by Banchbo Healing Touch.
 World Diabetes Day is on 14 November of every year. Events are organized by Banchbo Healing Touch.
 World Environment Day is on 5 June of every year. Events are organized by Banchbo and Metta Parishad, the youth wing of Garia Bauddha Sanskriti Samsad.
Doctors' Day is on 1 July of every year. Events are organized by Banchbo and Kendua Shanti Sangha.

In popular culture
In early 1953, the principal photography of Satyajit Ray's debut film Pather Panchali was done at Boral, which was then a small village on the outskirts of Kolkata and is now a locality of Garia. A decade later, Ray again shot a scene of Goopy Gyne Bagha Byne  in the dense bamboo groves near a pond in Garia.

Notable people

 Ashapurna Devi, highly acclaimed novelist and poet
 Anurag Basu, Bollywood, film director
 Kaushik Ganguly, film director
 Churni Ganguly, actress
 Locket Chatterjee, actress
 Rashid Khan, famous classical singer
 Srijato, poet
 Rajarshi Roychowdhury, writer
 Kabir Suman (poet, singer, musician and socio-political activist)

See also
 New Garia
 Kolkata Metro Railway Routes (North South Corridor)
 Kolkata Suburban Railway
 Eastern Metropolitan Bypass

References

External links

 Garia in Google Maps
 Garia in Yahoo Maps
 Garia in Bing Maps
 Garia in mapsofindia.com

Neighbourhoods in Kolkata
Red-light districts in India